Richard Glen Morgan (born 24 July 1972 in Wellington) is a former New Zealand cricketer who played first-class cricket for Auckland and Northern Districts from 1993 to 2002. His father, Harry Morgan, played for Wellington from 1963 to 1978.

Richard Morgan was a left-arm medium-pace bowler and right-handed tail-end batsman. His best figures were 5 for 44, for Auckland against Northern Districts in 2000–01. He retired after the 2002–03 season.

See also
 List of Auckland representative cricketers

References

External links 
 Richard Morgan at Cricinfo

1972 births
Living people
New Zealand cricketers
Auckland cricketers
Northern Districts cricketers
Cricketers from Wellington City